The Premio 40 Principales for Best Spanish Group was an honor presented annually at Los Premios 40 Principales. For the 2011 edition this award was merged with the Best Solo category into the Best Artist/Group award.

Los Premios 40 Principales
2006 establishments in Spain
2010 disestablishments in Spain
Awards established in 2006
Awards disestablished in 2010